The Daytripper is a Texas travel program, hosted by Chet Garner as he travels the state with his crew. The Daytripper is a 13-time Lone Star Emmy Award winning travel show airing on PBS that highlights the culture, outdoors and food of a single tourist destination or area within each episode.

Synopsis: "It’s no secret that Texas is big. Alright, more than big. Texas is HUGE!! And exploring Texas ain’t no small vacation, it’s a lifetime endeavor. But what if you only have one day? Well that’s where we come in. From the well-known landmarks to the completely obscure dives and hideaways – and all within a day’s reach. We created The Daytripper to inspire folks to get out and explore their own backyard. Adventure is much closer than you realize. I’ll see you on the road."

The series first aired on Austin's PBS station, KLRU, and was titled "The Austin Daytripper." However, the concept expanded and the show condensed its name to "The Daytripper" to have a wider appeal. The show is now produced by Hogaboom Road, Inc., a production company located in downtown Georgetown, TX that specializes in creating Texas content.

The Daytripper has aired 13 seasons. Episodes are broadcast on PBS affiliate stations in Texas and many other states around the country. They are also available for viewing online.

The Daytripper World Headquarters 

On April 26, 2019, The Daytripper announced the grand opening of its brick-and-mortar store located in Georgetown, TX. The Daytripper World Headquarters has become a popular location for Daytripper fans from around the United States to come and visit. The store showcases many products made by local Texas artists and businesses.

The Daytripper Field Guide App 

On March 2, 2020 (Texas Independence Day), The Daytripper released it first official app for both Apple and Android devices. The Daytripper Field Guide is a free way for people to find food & fun using a geolocated map. It also has trip guides that show destinations featured on The Daytripper TV show, Podcasts by Chet and his crew and full episodes that are available to watch under a Team Daytripper subscription.

Episodes

Season 1 (2009)

Season 2 (2010–2011)

Season 3 (2011–2012)

Season 4 (2012–2013)

Season 5 (2013–2014)

Season 6 (2014–2015)

Season 7 (2015–2016)

Season 8 (2016–2017)

Season 9 (2017–2018)

Season 10 (2018–2019)

Season 11 (2019–2020)

Season 12 (2020–2021)

Season 13 (2021–2022)

Awards 

2022
Lone Star Emmy Award Winner – Outstanding Program Host
Lone Star Emmy Award Nomination – Outstanding Magazine Program (Corsicana, TX)
Lone Star Emmy Award Nomination – Outstanding Historic/Cultural Program (Castroville, TX)
Lone Star Emmy Award Nomination – Outstanding Texas Heritage Program (Gruene, TX)
2021
Lone Star Emmy Award Nomination – Outstanding Program Host
Lone Star Emmy Award Winner – Outstanding Magazine Program (Graham, TX)
Lone Star Emmy Award Nomination – Outstanding Texas Heritage Program (Luckenbach, TX)
2020
Lone Star Emmy Award Winner – Outstanding Program Host
Lone Star Emmy Award Nomination – Outstanding Politics/Government Program (Texas Capital)
Lone Star Emmy Award Winner – Outstanding Texas Heritage Program (Tyler, TX)
Lone Star Emmy Award Nomination – Outstanding Magazine Program (Longview, TX)
2019
Lone Star Emmy Award Nomination – Outstanding Program Host
Lone Star Emmy Award Winner – Outstanding Magazine Program (Seguin, TX)
2018
Lone Star Emmy Award Winner – Outstanding Program Host
Lone Star Emmy Award Nomination – Outstanding Magazine Program (Hidden Houston, TX)
2017
Lone Star Emmy Award Nomination – Outstanding Magazine Program (San Saba, TX)
Lone Star Emmy Award Nomination – Outstanding Texas Heritage Program (San Antonio, TX)
2016
Lone Star Emmy Award Winner – Outstanding Program Host
Lone Star Emmy Award Nomination – Outstanding Texas Heritage Program (New Braunfels, TX)
2015
Lone Star Emmy Award Nomination – Outstanding Program Host
Lone Star Emmy Award Nomination – Outstanding Texas Heritage Program
Lone Star Emmy Award Nomination – Outstanding Magazine Program (Athens, TX)
2014
Lone Star Emmy Award Winner – Outstanding Program Host

2013
Lone Star Emmy Award Winner – Outstanding Magazine Program-Series (San Antonio, TX)
Lone Star Emmy Award Winner – Outstanding Program Host
Lone Star Emmy Award Nomination – Outstanding Texas Heritage Segment

2012
Lone Star Emmy Award Winner – Outstanding Magazine Program-Series (Marfa, TX)
Lone Star Emmy Award Nomination – Outstanding Program Host
Lone Star Emmy Award Nomination – Outstanding Texas Heritage Program/Special

2011
Lone Star Emmy Award Winner – Outstanding Achievement in a Texas Heritage Program/Special (Brenham, TX)
Lone Star Emmy Award Nomination – Outstanding Program Host
Lone Star Emmy Award Nomination – Outstanding Editor – Program (non-news)

2010
Lone Star Emmy Award Winner – Outstanding Texas Heritage Program/Special (Bastrop, TX)
Lone Star Emmy Award Nomination – Outstanding Program Host
Lone Star Emmy Award Nomination – Outstanding Achievement in a Magazine Program

References

External links 
 thedaytripper.com

Emmy Award winners
Television shows set in Texas
Television shows set in New Braunfels, Texas
Television shows set in Dallas
PBS original programming